The men's 50m freestyle S11 event at the 2008 Summer Paralympics took place at the Beijing National Aquatics Center on 14 September. There were three heats; the swimmers with the eight fastest times advanced to the final.

Results

Heats
Competed from 09:00.

Heat 1

Heat 2

Heat 3

Final
Competed at 17:00.

 
Q = qualified for final. WR = World Record.

References
 
 

Swimming at the 2008 Summer Paralympics